Chi chi dango is a soft, sweet type of dango, a mochiko (sweet rice flour) dessert confection of Japanese origin. It is popular in Hawaii, particularly during Girl's Day celebrations.

See also
 Mochi
 Botan Rice Candy
 Hawaiian cuisine

References

Hawaiian cuisine
Rice dishes
Confectionery